The 2008 Supercopa de España was two-leg Spanish football matches played on 17 August and 24 August 2008. It was contested by Valencia, who were Spanish Cup winners in 2007–08, and Real Madrid, who won the 2007–08 La Liga. Real Madrid won 6–5 on aggregate for their eighth Supercopa de España title.

Match details

First leg

Second leg

References

Supercopa de Espana Final
Supercopa de Espana 2008
Supercopa de Espana 2008
Supercopa de España